The Pittsburgh Locomotive and Car Works was a railroad equipment manufacturing company founded by Andrew Carnegie and T.N. Miller in 1865. It was located in Allegheny, Pennsylvania, a suburb of Pittsburgh and since 1907 part of that city.

It repaired an early locomotive known as Bausman's Rhinoceros in April 1867. 
Starting in the 1870s under its superintendent and general manager Daniel A. Wightman, it became known for its production of large locomotives.  Its engines were shipped around the world, including India and Japan.

By 1901, when Pittsburgh had merged with seven other manufacturing companies to form American Locomotive Company (ALCO), Pittsburgh had produced over 2,400 locomotives.  In March 1919, ALCO closed the Pittsburgh facility.

Preserved Pittsburgh locomotives

Pre-1901 merger 
Following is a list (in serial number order) of Pittsburgh locomotives built before the ALCO merger that have been spared the scrapper's torch.

Post-1901 merger
Following is a list (in serial number order) of Pittsburgh locomotives built after the ALCO merger that have been spared the scrapper's torch.

Notes

External links
American History Site
SteamLocomotive.info list of extant ALCO-Pittsburgh locomotives.
Maritime Railway site History of Maritime Railway and disposition of its locomotives.

Andrew Carnegie
Defunct locomotive manufacturers of the United States
Manufacturing companies based in Pittsburgh
Industrial buildings and structures in Pennsylvania
Vehicle manufacturing companies established in 1865
Vehicle manufacturing companies disestablished in 1901
1865 establishments in Pennsylvania
1901 disestablishments in Pennsylvania
Defunct manufacturing companies based in Pennsylvania